Snooker is a cue sport that is played on a baize-covered table with pockets in each of the four corners and in the middle of each of the long side cushions. It is played using a cue and snooker balls: one white , 15  worth one point each (sometimes played with fewer red balls, commonly 6 or 10), and six balls of different : yellow (2 points), green (3), brown (4), blue (5), pink (6), black (7). A player (or team) wins a match when they have achieved the best-of score from a pre-determined number of frames. The number of frames is always odd so as to prevent a tie or a draw.

The table
Snooker is played on a rectangular snooker table with six pockets, one at each corner and one in the middle of each long side. The table usually has a slate base, covered in green baize. A baulk line is drawn across the width of the table,  from the cushion at one end; these two latter items are respectively designated as the baulk cushion and baulk end. A semicircle of radius , called the D, is drawn behind this line, with its centre on the midpoint. The cushion at the other end of the table is known as the top cushion.

The balls used are sometimes also scaled down, and/or reduced in number (in the case of the reds) by omitting the longest row of balls in the rack.

The balls

Snooker balls, like Billiard balls, are typically made of phenolic resin, and are smaller than American pool balls. Regulation snooker balls (which are specified in metric units) are nominally 52.5 mm (approximately  inches) in diameter, though many sets are actually manufactured at 52.4 mm (about  in). No weight for the balls is specified in the rules, only that the weight of any two balls should not differ by more than 0.5 g. Some recreational sets (which are usually not measured metrically) are  in (about 54 mm) up to as large as pool balls, at  in (about 57.2 mm); larger ball size requires wider pocket openings. Miniature sets also exist, for half-size home tables. There are fifteen , six  (yellow, green, brown, blue, pink, and black), and one white . Usually none of the balls are numbered, though the six colour balls often are in the US, where they are easily mistaken at first glance for pool balls (the design is similar, but the numbering does not match pool's scheme).

At the beginning of a frame, the balls are set up in the arrangement shown in the illustration. The six colours (a term referring to all balls except the white and the reds) are placed on their own spots. On the baulk line, looking up the table from the baulk end, the green ball is located where the "D" meets the line on the left, the brown ball in the middle of the line, and the yellow ball where the "D" meets the line on the right. This order is often remembered using the mnemonic God Bless You, the first letter of each word being the first letter of the three colours (Green, Brown, Yellow). The blue ball rests at the exact centre of the table, while the pink is placed midway between it and the top cushion. The red balls are arranged in a tightly-packed triangle behind the pink, with the apex as close as possible to the pink but not touching it. Finally, the black ball is placed on a spot  from the top cushion, centred from left to right so that the brown, blue, pink, and black balls all sit on an imaginary line that bisects the table along its length.

Objective
The objective of the game of snooker is to strike the white cue ball with a cue so that it strikes the object balls in turn and causes them to fall into one of the six pockets, called potting. Points are scored for potting balls legally, in accordance with the rules described below, or in the event of a foul committed by the opponent. The player who scores more points wins the frame, and the first player to win a set number of frames wins the match.

Match
A match usually consists of a fixed, odd number of frames. A frame begins with setting up the balls as described above. A frame ends when all balls are potted, or when one of the players concedes defeat due to being too far behind on points to tie or beat the opponent's score.

A match ends when one player has won enough frames to make it impossible for the other player to catch up. For example, in a match of 19 frames, the first player to win 10 is the victor.

In most versions of snooker there is no time limit between shots. But in some the maximum time allowed for each shot is 60 seconds, otherwise a foul is incurred.

Gameplay

At the beginning of each frame, the balls are set up by the referee as explained. The frame begins with one player taking the cue ball in-hand, placing it anywhere on or inside the D and attempting to hit one or more of the red balls on an initial break-off shot. A common strategy for this shot involves placing the cue ball on the baulk line, between the brown ball and either the green or yellow ball. The break-off alternates between players on successive frames.

Only one player may visit the table at a time. A break is the number of points scored in a single visit to the table. A player's turn and break end when they commit a foul, fail to pot a ball, or when a frame is complete.

The ball or balls that can be hit first by the cue ball are called the ball(s) "on" for that particular stroke. The ball(s) "on" differ from shot to shot: a red ball is always the ball "on" for the first stroke of a player's turn and, if potted, must be followed by a colour.  A potted colour must be followed by a red, and each player alternates between a red and any choice of colour until a break ends with a miss or the reds are all potted. If any reds remain unpotted at the end of a break, the remaining red balls are "on" for the opponent's first shot. Only "on" balls may be potted legally; potting a ball not "on" constitutes a foul. All of the reds are "on" for the break-off shot, and for the first shot of any turn in which one or more reds are still on the table.

Each frame of snooker generally consists of two phases. The first phase lasts as long as any red balls remain on the table. During this phase, all red balls are "on" for the beginning of a player's turn; the player must therefore first hit and attempt to pot one or more of them. If the player either commits a foul or fails to pot a red, the turn ends and the opponent begins to play.

Each legally potted red ball awards one point and remains off the table until the end of the frame. The player continues their turn by nominating one of the six colours (yellow, green, brown, blue, pink, black) as the ball "on" for the next shot. The rules of the game indicate that the player must state the desired colour to the referee, although it is usually clear which ball the player is attempting to pot, making a formal nomination unnecessary unless the referee insists on it.

Potting the nominated colour awards further points (two through seven, in the same order as the preceding paragraph). The referee then removes the colour from the pocket and replaces it on the table in its original spot. If that spot is occupied (that is, if the ball cannot be placed on it without touching another ball), then the ball is placed on the highest available spot. If all spots are occupied, it is placed as close to its own spot as possible in a direct line between that spot and the top cushion, without touching another ball. If there is no room this side of the spot, it will be placed as close to the spot as possible in a straight line towards the bottom cushion, without touching another ball. The player then resumes play, with the red balls "on" again.

The alternation between red balls and colours ends when all reds have been potted and an attempt (successful or not) to pot a colour is made after the last red is potted, or when the last red is potted or knocked off the table as the result of a foul and is not replaced. All six colours have then to be potted in ascending order of their value (yellow, green, brown, blue, pink, black). Each becomes the ball "on" in that order. During this phase, the colours are not replaced on the table after being legally potted; however, any colour potted as the result of a foul is re-spotted.

After all six colours have been potted, the player with the higher score wins the frame (but see below for end-of-frame scenarios).

Because only one of the colours can be "on" at any given time, it is a foul to first hit multiple colours at the same time, or pot more than one colour (unless a free ball has been awarded; see below).

Touching ball
If the cue ball comes to rest in direct contact with a ball that is on or could be on, the referee shall declare a "touching ball". The striker must "play away" from that ball without moving it, but is not required to hit any other ball because the touching ball is on. If the object ball moves, it is considered a "push shot" and a foul is called. No penalty is incurred for playing away if:

 The ball is on. Example: Striker pots a colour, making the reds on for the next shot, and the cue ball comes to rest touching one of them.
 The ball could be on and the striker nominates it as on. Example: Striker pots a red, cue ball comes to rest touching the green, and the striker declares that ball as on.
 The ball could be on, and the striker nominates another ball as on and hits it first. Example: Striker pots a red, cue ball comes to rest touching the green, and the striker declares the black as on and hits it first.

If the cue ball is touching another ball which could not be on (e.g. touching a colour when the striker must pot a red, or vice versa), a touching ball is not called, and the striker must play away from it and hit a legally nominated object ball. Where the cue ball is simultaneously touching several balls that are on or could be on, the referee shall indicate that each and every one of them is a touching ball; the striker must therefore play away from all of them.

The striker scores no points for balls potted as the result of a foul. Depending on the situation, these balls will either remain off the table; be returned to their original spots; or be replaced in the positions they occupied before the foul shot, along with any other balls that were moved during the shot. For details on such situations, see Fouls below.
If a player fails to pot a ball "on", whether a red or a nominated colour, the other player will come to the table, with the reds always being the balls "on" as long as there are still reds on the table.

Fouls
A foul is a shot or action by the striker which is against the rules of the game.
When a foul is made during a shot, the player's turn ends, and no points are awarded for any balls potted on that shot.
Common fouls are:
 Failing to hit any other ball with the cue ball.
 First hitting a ball "not-on" with the cue ball.
 Potting a ball "not-on".
 Potting the cue ball (in-off).
 Touching any object ball with anything but the cue ball.
 Touching any ball before all balls have come to a complete stop.
 Hitting the cue ball more than once on the same shot.
 Making a ball land off the table.
 Touching the cue ball with anything other than the tip of the cue. The exception is that while positioning the cue ball "in-hand"; it may be touched by anything except the tip of the cue.
 Playing a "push shot" – a shot in which an object ball (whether "on" or not) in direct contact with the cue ball moves when the cue ball is hit, unless the cue ball hits a very fine edge of the object ball. 
 Playing a "jump shot" – a shot where the cue ball leaves the bed of the table and jumps over any part of a ball before first hitting another ball.
 Playing a shot with both feet off the ground. The player may lean over the table, support a portion of their weight on it, and/or use a mechanical bridge as desired, but at least one foot must remain in contact with the ground.
When a player commits a foul and the cue ball remains on the table, the opponent may either play from the resulting position or—if the position is disadvantageous—request the offender play again. If the cue ball is potted or leaves the table, the opponent receives it "in-hand" and may then place it anywhere on or within the "D" for the next shot.

It is sometimes erroneously believed that potting two or more balls in one shot is an automatic foul. This is only true if one of the potted balls is not "on" (e.g. a red and a colour, or two different colours). When the reds are "on", two or more of them may be legally potted in the same shot and are worth one point each; however, the player may only nominate and attempt to pot one colour on the next shot. If a free ball has been granted (see below), a colour may be legally potted in the same shot as a red or another colour, depending on the circumstances.

Should a cue ball be touched with the tip while "in-hand", i.e. when breaking-off or playing from the "D" after being potted or knocked off the table, a foul is not committed as long as the referee is satisfied that the player was only positioning the ball, and not playing a shot or preparing to play one.

The following fouls award seven points to the opponent when committed:

 Playing at reds, or a free ball followed by a red, in successive strokes
 Failing to declare which ball is "on" when requested to do so by the referee
 After potting a red or free ball nominated as a red, committing a foul before nominating a colour
 Using a ball off the table for any purpose
 Using any object to measure gaps or distance

Any other foul awards points to the opponent equal to the value of the ball "on", the highest value of all balls involved in the foul, or four points, whichever is highest. If multiple fouls are committed in one shot, only the penalty for the highest-valued foul is scored. The penalty for a foul is thus no lower than four points and no higher than seven.

Not hitting the ball "on" first is the most common foul. A common defensive tactic is to play a shot that leaves the opponent unable to hit a ball "on" directly. This is most commonly called "snookering" one's opponent, or alternatively "laying a snooker" or putting the other player "in a snooker".

Because players receive points for fouls by their opponents, repeatedly snookering one's opponent is a possible way of winning a frame when potting all the balls on the table would be insufficient to ensure a win or tie. This portion of the frame is known as the "snookers-required" stage.

Free ball

There were many variations of the rules of snooker in the late 18th century and early 19th century. The Billiards and Snooker Control Council (B&SCC) codified and unified the rules of snooker in 1919. The rules included having a free ball instead of playing from '' when there was no clear shot at the object ball after a foul. 

A free ball is a player-nominated substitute for the ball "on" when a player becomes snookered as the result of a foul committed by the opponent. The snooker is considered illegitimate in this case, and the affected player is allowed to nullify it by nominating any object ball as being "on" for the first shot of their turn. Once the free ball shot is taken legally, the game continues normally; however, if the player who committed the foul is asked to play again, a free ball is not granted. If the free ball is potted by itself, it is respotted and the player scores the points for the actual ball "on."

For example, as illustrated in the provided picture, if the ball "on" is the red, but is snookered by the black due to a foul, the fouled player will be able to name any colour as the free ball. The player could then pot the chosen colour as if it were a red for one point. The colour will then be respotted, the player will nominate a colour to be on for the next shot, and normal play will resume.

As a natural corollary of the rules, the free ball is always a colour ball. By the nature of the rule, if there are any reds on the table, the "ball on" must be a red as the opponent committed a foul and it is the start of the next player's turn.  At a point in the frame after the reds are all potted, a free ball must then naturally be a colour ball. 

The scoring for a shot in which both the free ball and the actual ball on are potted depends on the point in the game at which it occurs. If the reds are on and both the free ball and one or more reds are potted, then each ball potted is scored as a red for one point. If a colour is on and both it and the free ball are potted, only the actual ball on is scored. In both cases, the free ball will be re-spotted and the actual ball(s) on will remain off the table. These two situations represent the only times when a colour can be potted in the same shot as a red or another colour without a foul occurring.

The player may hit the free ball into the actual ball on in order to pot the latter, referred to as planting. Going back to the picture above, the player could nominate the black as the free ball and use it to plant the real red. If the player potted both balls in one shot, two points would be awarded and the black would be re-spotted. A foul is committed if the player fails to strike the free ball either first by itself, or simultaneously with the actual ball on.

Failing to pot the free ball incurs no penalty, so the striker may play a snooker using the free ball if desired. However, if said snooker is achieved by having the free ball obstructing the ball on, then the strike is a foul and a penalty of the value of the ball on is awarded to the opponent. The reason is that the free ball was to be treated as the ball on, and one cannot snooker a ball on by another ball on (following the same logic that a red cannot snooker another red when red is on). The only exception to this is when there are only two balls remaining on the table, namely pink and black. If the opposition somehow fouled trying to pot pink, and illegitimately snookered the striker with the black, then it is fair for the striker to snooker the opposition "back" with the free black ball.

A free ball scenario does not occur when the ball gets stuck at the edge of a pocket jaw (commonly referred to as "angled") in such a manner that the player is unable to hit any ball on. This is because according to the official snooker rules a ball is snookered only if its way is obstructed by balls not on. In this scenario, after a foul, the player may choose to either take the shot from the current position or ask the offender to play again, as per the usual rules on fouls.

Foul and a miss

In this case, the opponent has the option to request that all balls on the table be returned to their position before the foul, and require the fouling player to take the shot again.

The rule was introduced to prevent players from playing  (i.e., deliberately fouling so as to leave the balls in a safe position, reducing the risk of giving a frame-winning chance to the opponent). Multiple misses often occur because players attempt to hit a shot very softly or thinly in situations where a fuller contact might leave their opponent an easy potting chance. This can lead to an apparently easy  being attempted several times, as players feel that it is better to concede many points but leave a safe position, than concede none and leave a frame-winning chance.

In practice, the "best attempt" determination consists of three key elements:
 Whether the player's choice of shot is the easiest to be achieved. If a player deliberately attempts a difficult shot with an easier escape available, intention to leave the opponent a bad position after a foul is presumed, and thus a miss will be called.
 Whether the cue ball has been hit with sufficient strength to reach the ball "on". Undershooting almost always results in a miss, as intention to leave the opponent in a bad position after a foul is again presumed in this case.
 Whether the player has tried to get the cue ball as close to the ball "on" as possible.
All three of these elements must be present in order for the referee to decide that a player has made their best attempt.

There are three situations in which a miss will not be called, even if the referee decides that a best attempt has not been made:
 If either player needs penalty points to win a frame, or if either player would need them after the current penalty is applied. This is to prevent the players from running up the score by repeatedly missing in worst-case scenarios.
 If the score difference is equal to the number of points still on the table, either before or after the penalty is applied, and the referee believes that the foul was not intentional. This is to prevent the score difference from decreasing too much, at the referee's discretion.
 If it is physically impossible to play a legal shot (the snooker is truly inescapable, as judged by the referee). The player must still put sufficient strength into the shot so that the cue ball would be able to reach its target if it were not obstructed, and attempt a shot that could succeed if the obstruction were not present.

If a player fouls and misses in a non-snookered scenario, and if the opponent requests that the shot be replayed from the original position, a second failure to make a best attempt is ruled a foul and a miss regardless of the score difference. The fouling player is issued a warning by the referee, and a third such failure forfeits the frame to the opponent.  A foul after such a warning is very rare.

The end of a frame
A frame normally ends in one of three ways.
 A concession, in which one player gives up due to being too far behind to have a realistic chance of winning the frame. Concession before the  stage may be interpreted as unsporting conduct and result in a penalty of a second frame being applied.
 The final black is potted legally (including after a re-spot), and this does not leave the score tied.
 The striker leads by more than seven points with only the black remaining. They may claim the win at this point, but may also elect to pot the black despite having won the frame after potting the pink. This may be done if the striker wishes to complete a high-scoring break (see "Maximum break" below).

There are three less common ways to end a frame:
 A foul on the black, when the black is the only ball left. It is sometimes wrongly assumed that play continues after a foul on the black if there are fewer than seven points between the scores. This is not the case: the player who is in the lead following the assessment of a penalty after a foul, when only the black remains, becomes the winner.
 Failure to hit a ball "on" three times in a row, if the player has a clear sight of the ball. The referee will warn a player after a second such miss that a third miss will mean that the opponent will be awarded the frame. This rule does not apply if the player is snookered. As missing due to avoiding a direct shot on a ball is usually a tactical, rather than skill-related, outcome, this rule is rarely invoked, as a player will simply hit the ball directly on the third shot.
 A player may incur a verbal warning if the referee deems that they are taking too long to shoot. Additional hesitation may forfeit the frame to the opponent at the referee's discretion.

If the score is tied after the final black is fouled or potted, the black is re-spotted. The winner of a coin toss by the referee decides which player will take first strike at the black; that player receives the cue ball "in-hand" for their first shot. Play then continues normally until the black is potted or another frame-ending situation occurs.

If the players reach a stalemate situation, as determined by either their own indication or the referee's judgment, they may choose to discard the scores from the current frame and restart it. Should the stalemate last for a certain period of time as specified by the referee, the players must restart the frame.

Maximum break

The highest break that can be made under normal circumstances is 147. To achieve it, the player must pot all 15 reds, with the black after every red, followed by potting all six colours.

This "maximum break" of 147 rarely occurs in match play. The fastest maximum break in a tournament was achieved during the World Championships on 21 April 1997, by Ronnie O'Sullivan against Mick Price in five minutes and eight seconds.

If an opponent fouls before any balls are potted, and leaves the player a free ball, the player can then nominate a colour and play it as a red for one point, then nominate a colour and pot it for its normal value. It is thus possible to score for 16 reds and blacks (16 * 8), plus the values of all the colours (27), resulting in a break of 155. Under tournament conditions, Jamie Burnett achieved 148 points.

The highest possible score, as distinct from the highest possible break, is unlimited and depends on the value of points scored from the opponent's foul shots when added to the player's own scored points (which may not require the highest break). However, the highest possible score from a single visit clearance is 162 (foul on the black, followed by a free ball treated as a red, as above).

References

External links
 Official Rules of the Games of Snooker and English Billiards Published by WPBSA, revised May 2022

Rules
Snooker